Grand Union Hotel can refer to:
 Grand Union Hotel (Newbury Park, California), listed on the National Register of Historic Places
 Grand Union Hotel (Fort Benton, Montana), listed on the National Register of Historic Places
 Grand Union Hotel (Saratoga Springs, New York)

See also
 Grand Hotel Union, Ljubljana, Slovenia
 Union Hotel (disambiguation)